Jalam Singh Rawlot is an Indian politician who is a former MLA of Sheo (Rajasthan Assembly constituency). He is a former district president of Bharatiya Janata Party Barmer. He is a national level leader of the Bharatiya Janata Party.

References 

Indian politicians
Bharatiya Janata Party politicians from Rajasthan
Living people
Year of birth missing (living people)